O Sorriso do Lagarto (The Lizard's Smile) is a Brazilian television series that first aired on Rede Globo in 1991.

Cast
 Tony Ramos - João Pedroso
 Raul Cortez - Angelo Marcos
 Maitê Proença - Ana Clara
 Carlos Augusto Strazzer - Peçanha
 José Lewgoy - Lúcio Nemésio
 Lúcia Veríssimo - Bebel
 Alexandre Frota - Tavinho
 Claudio Mamberti - Cirino
 Ana Paula Bouzas - Branca
 Marcelo Picchi - Nando
 Ana Beatriz Nogueira - Evangelina
 Sofia Papo - Maria das Mercês
 Pedro Paulo Rangel - Padre Monteirinho
 Fábio Sabag - Bará
 Chiquinho Brandão - Chico

References

External links
 O Sorriso do Lagarto at Rede Globo 
 

1991 Brazilian television series debuts
1991 Brazilian television series endings
Brazilian television series
Television shows based on Brazilian novels
Rede Globo original programming